Kelly Douglas Wunsch (born July 12, 1972) is an American former Major League Baseball (MLB) pitcher who played for the Chicago White Sox and Los Angeles Dodgers from 2000 to 2005.

Amateur career
A native of Houston, Texas, Wunsch attended Texas A&M University. In 1992, he played collegiate summer baseball with the Orleans Cardinals of the Cape Cod Baseball League and was named a league all-star.

Professional career
Drafted by the Milwaukee Brewers in the 1st round of the 1993 Major League Baseball Draft, Wunsch made his Major League Baseball debut with the Chicago White Sox on April 3, 2000. After joining the Dodgers in 2005, Wunsch pitched quite well as a left-handed specialist, but was plagued by injuries. He signed with the Houston Astros in February 2007 to attempt a comeback, but was released on March 28.

During his playing career, Wunsch's delivery was somewhere between sidearm and submarine, and has been described as akin to flipping a frisbee.

References

External links
, or Retrosheet
Pura Pelota (Venezuelan Winter League)
 

1972 births
Living people
Baseball players from Houston
Beloit Brewers players
Beloit Snappers players
Charlotte Knights players
Chicago White Sox players
El Paso Diablos players
Helena Brewers players
Huntsville Stars players
Las Vegas 51s players
Los Angeles Dodgers players
Louisville Redbirds players
Louisville RiverBats players
Major League Baseball pitchers
Stockton Ports players
Texas A&M Aggies baseball players
Orleans Firebirds players
Tiburones de La Guaira players
American expatriate baseball players in Venezuela
American expatriate baseball players in Australia
Brisbane Bandits players
Anchorage Glacier Pilots players